The Helpmann Award for Best Contemporary Concert Presentation was an award, presented by Live Performance Australia (LPA) at the annual Helpmann Awards from 2003-2004. The award was first presented in 2003, as an award for a concert presentation but was split into three categories in 2004, for concerts in arena's, stadium's and theatre's. The awards were replaced by the awards for Best Australian Contemporary Concert, Best Contemporary Music Festival and Best International Contemporary Concert. In the following list winners are listed first and marked in gold, in boldface, and the nominees are listed below with no highlight.

Winners and nominees

Source:

Best Contemporary Music Concert Presentation

Best Contemporary Concert Presentation – Arena

Best Contemporary Concert Presentation – Stadium

Best Contemporary Concert Presentation – Theatre

See also
Best Australian Contemporary Concert 
Best Contemporary Music Festival 
Best International Contemporary Concert

References

External links
The official Helpmann Awards website

C